Umberto Cazzola (born 12 January 1982) is an Italian football midfielder.

Caps on Italian Series 

Serie B : 9 apps

Serie C1 : 196 apps, 12 goals

Serie D : 46 apps, 1 goal

Total : 251 apps, 13 goals

External links
Profile at lega-calcio.it

1982 births
People from Fano
Living people
Italian footballers
Association football midfielders
Vis Pesaro dal 1898 players
A.S. Gubbio 1910 players
Serie D players
Serie C players
Serie B players
Sportspeople from the Province of Pesaro and Urbino
Footballers from Marche